The Secretary-General of the Council of the European Union heads the General Secretariat of the Council of the European Union. In April 2015, the Council appointed the Danish diplomat Jeppe Tranholm-Mikkelsen as Secretary-General of the Council for the period from 1 July 2015 to 30 June 2020. He was appointed for a second term on 29 April 2020. The second, five-year term runs from 1 July 2020 to 30 June 2025.

Previously, the post holder was also the High Representative for the Common Foreign and Security Policy, President of the European Defence Agency and the Western European Union. The Treaty of Amsterdam created the office of the High Representative for the Common Foreign and Security Policy and specified that the Secretary-General would occupy that position simultaneously. Javier Solana exercised both functions from 1999 until 2009. The Lisbon Treaty redefined the post of High Representative and again separated it from the office of Secretary-General of the Council.

As of 2010, the Secretary-General's basic pay is equal to that of a top-tier civil servant: €17,697.68 per month.

List of Secretaries-General

See also
 President of the European Council

References

Politics of the European Union
Council of the European Union
Political offices of the European Union
Secretaries-general